The Netherlands women's national cricket team toured Sri Lanka in November 1997. They played Sri Lanka in 3 One Day Internationals, winning the series 2–1. The matches were the first ever played by the Sri Lanka women's cricket team.

Squads

WODI Series

1st ODI

2nd ODI

2nd ODI

References

External links
Netherlands Women tour of Sri Lanka 1997/98 from Cricinfo

1997 in women's cricket
Women's international cricket tours of Sri Lanka
Sri Lanka